The Manitoba Bar Association (MBA) is an organization of members of the legal profession in Manitoba, Canada. It is a non-profit professional association, and is a branch of the Canadian Bar Association. As of 2021, the MBA represents approximately 1,400 members from across the province, including lawyers, judges, notaries, law teachers, and law students.

History 
The Manitoba Bar Association was preceded by the Winnipeg Bar Association, which had been in operation since June 1906. On 10 November 1911, the Winnipeg Association decided that it would expand to a province-wide organization.

Governance and membership 
The Manitoba Bar Association is governed by an elected council of 20 members who are elected for a two-year term. There are 15 elected members from the Winnipeg, two from Dauphin/western Manitoba, two from central/eastern Manitoba, and one from northern Manitoba.

As of 2021, the MBA represents approximately 1,400 members from across the province, including lawyers, judges, notaries, law teachers, and law students.

The MBA currently has 36 active Sections. Sections are groups of members who practise in a particular area of the law or share a common goal or interest.  Registration in an MBA Section automatically enrolls the member in the corresponding National Section.  Members registered for a Section are entitled to participate in the business and activities of that Section, including voting and nomination for office.

See also 

 Law Society of Manitoba

References

External links
 

Bar associations of Canada

Legal organizations based in Manitoba